Witteveen is a village in the Dutch province of Drenthe. It is a part of the municipality of Midden-Drenthe, and lies about 16 km northeast of Hoogeveen.

The village was first mentioned in 1856 as "het Witteveen", and means "white peat". In 1926, the peat was excavated as part of a project for the unemployed. 50 houses were built to house the workers. In 1929, a small Dutch Reformed church was built. The church is nowadays used as a residential home.

Gallery

References

External links 

Midden-Drenthe
Populated places in Drenthe